Fred Fleck (June 6, 1892 – November 9, 1961), also known as Fred A. Fleck, Frederick Fleck, or Freddie Fleck, was an American assistant director and production manager.  Born in New York City on June 4, 1892, he broke into the film business as an assistant director on the 1928 silent film, The Riding Renegade, directed by Wallace Fox. During his 30-year career, he would work on some notable films, with some notable directors. Some of those films include: the epic Hell's Angels (1930), directed by Howard Hughes; King Vidor's Bird of Paradise (1932); the Ginger Rogers' 1941 vehicle, Tom, Dick and Harry, directed by Garson Kanin; 1942's The Magnificent Ambersons, directed by Orson Welles, and starring Joseph Cotten and Anne Baxter; Born to be Bad (1950), starring Joan Fontaine and Robert Ryan; and Josef von Sternberg's Jet Pilot (1957), starring John Wayne. Fleck was also one of the aerial cameramen on George Archainbaud's classic 1932 film, The Lost Squadron.

Fleck was also production manager on several notable films, including: Sylvia Scarlett, directed by George Cukor, and starring Katharine Hepburn; the Fred Astaire and Ginger Rogers' 1936 vehicle, Swing Time, directed by George Stevens; Gregory La Cava's 1937 Stage Door, starring Hepburn, Rogers and Adolphe Menjou; and The Las Vegas Story (1952), directed by Robert Stevenson, and starring Jane Russell and Victor Mature.

Even though Jet Pilot was released in 1957, it was produced in 1949–50, and sat on the shelf for seven years.  The last film Fleck worked on was as a production manager on Son of Sinbad in 1955. He would die on November 9, 1961, in North Hollywood, California.

Filmography

(as per AFI's database)

References

American film directors
American cinematographers
1892 births
1961 deaths
Male actors from New York City